Today Extra is an Australian morning talk show, with an infotainment base, hosted by David Campbell and Sylvia Jeffreys. The show airs between 9:00 am and 11:30 am weekdays and follows the Nine Network's breakfast news program Today, with both programs closely interlinked. The show is broadcast from the Nine Network studios in North Sydney, a suburb located on the North Shore of Sydney, New South Wales.

History 
The show premiered on the Nine Network on 6 February 2012 as Mornings and features interviews, live music performances and segments on cooking, lifestyle, fashion and beauty, entertainment and a wide range of other topics. Mornings replaced the long-running morning show Kerri-Anne.

In January 2015, Nine relaunched Mornings with a new set and logo. Wendy Kingston and Georgie Gardner filled in for Sonia Kruger whilst she was on maternity leave. Kingston presented on Monday and Gardner presented from Tuesday to Friday. They presented until Kruger returned on Monday 27 April.

On 5 May 2015, Mornings was extended to 11.30am. As a result, Nine's Morning News was moved to 11.30am.

In January 2016, Nine announced that Mornings would be rebranded as Today Extra to become an extension of the network's breakfast show Today. The show was moved to the Today studio, while keeping its focus on light entertainment and news updates.

In January 2019, Campbell was announced the new host of Weekend Today. He continued to host the program on Monday, Tuesday and Wednesday, with Richard Wilkins joining the show as co-host on Thursday and Friday. Campbell remained in the position until December 2019, when it was announced that in 2020 David would host Today Extra full time with Wilkins replacing him on Weekend Today.

In November 2019, Kruger announced her resignation from the Nine Network, with her last show on Friday 15 November. In December 2019, it was announced that Kruger's temporary replacement Sylvia Jeffreys would replace Kruger permanently upon her return from maternity leave in 2020. It was also announced that Campbell would return to hosting the show each weekday, with Wilkins moving to hosting Weekend Today.

On 9 March 2020, actress Rita Wilson appeared on the show in a segment hosted by David Campbell and Belinda Russell, who was filling in for Sylvia Jeffreys on maternity leave. Three days later, she was diagnosed with Coronavirus. As a result, the Nine Network ordered all program personnel who come into contact with Wilson, including Campbell and Russell, enter isolation. All employees were tested, and were confirmed as to not have contracted the illness.

Hosts

Former hosts

Fill-in presenters
Current presenters who have been fill-in hosts or co-hosts of Today Extra in recent times include Amber Sherlock, Belinda Russell, Brooke Boney, Richard Wilkins, Jayne Azzopardi, Lara Vella, Charles Croucher, Tim Davies and Tom Tilley.

Regular segments

Ratings
The first episode of Mornings attracted 104,000, trailing The Morning Show, which attracted 166,000 viewers. However, in October 2012, Mornings beat The Morning Show for the first time since its launch.

On 19 March 2016, six weeks after the relaunch to Today Extra, the program won the week against The Morning Show. This included a victory in Perth, which for many years has been Nine's weakest market ratings-wise. It was the first time The Morning Show lost a week in its nine-year history.

References

External links
 

Nine Network original programming
2012 Australian television series debuts
Australian variety television shows
Australian television news shows
Television shows set in Sydney
English-language television shows
Australian television talk shows